Barnesville is a village in Belmont County, Ohio, United States. It is located in the central portion of Warren Township in Belmont County and is part of the Wheeling metropolitan area. The population was 4,008 at the 2020 census.

History
The town was named after James Barnes, who was the first settler. Barnes was born in Montgomery County, Maryland and was married to Nancy Harrison, "an intelligent Quaker lady". Barnes owned a farm in Montgomery County, and later laid out a town there, also known as Barnesville, Maryland, where he operated a country store for a while.  
 
In 1803 he moved to St. Clairsville, Ohio where he operated a tavern and general store.  In 1806 Barnes settled in Warren Township in Belmont County where he cleared forest, built a house, established a tannery and general store and planted orchards.  In November 1808, the town of Barnesville was laid out, and four years later Mr. Barnes and his family became permanent residents of the new village.  Barnesville was described in 1833 as having six stores and a steam mill.

Barnesville was incorporated as a village in 1835.

Geography

Climate

Demographics

2010 census
As of the census of 2010, there were 4,193 people, 1,763 households, and 1,114 families living in the village. The racial makeup of the village was 97.0% White, 0.9% African American, 0.1% Native American, 0.3% Asian, and 1.6% from two or more races. Hispanic or Latino of any race were 0.6% of the population.

There were 1,763 households, of which 29.4% had children under the age of 18 living with them, 42.4% were married couples living together, 15.7% had a female householder with no husband present, 5.1% had a male householder with no wife present, and 36.8% were non-families. 32.0% of all households were made up of individuals, and 16.3% had someone living alone who was 65 years of age or older. The average household size was 2.28 and the average family size was 2.82.

The median age in the village was 41.4 years. 21.4% of residents were under the age of 18; 8.9% were between the ages of 18 and 24; 23.9% were from 25 to 44; 25.5% were from 45 to 64; and 20.5% were 65 years of age or older. The gender makeup of the village was 46.2% male and 53.8% female.

2000 census
As of the census of 2000, there were 4,225 people, 1,769 households, and 1,119 families living in the village. The population density was 2,196.6 people per square mile (849.6/km2). There were 1,964 housing units at an average density of 1,021.1 per square mile (395.0/km2). The racial makeup of the village was 98.41% White, 0.71% African American, 0.07% Native American, 0.17% Asian, and 0.64% from two or more races. Hispanic or Latino of any race were 0.26% of the population.

There were 1,769 households, out of which 28.9% had children under the age of 18 living with them, 45.5% were married couples living together, 13.9% had a female householder with no husband present, and 36.7% were non-families. 33.7% of all households were made up of individuals, and 18.5% had someone living alone who was 65 years of age or older. The average household size was 2.30 and the average family size was 2.94.

In the village, the population was spread out, with 23.6% under the age of 18, 8.3% from 18 to 24, 25.5% from 25 to 44, 21.7% from 45 to 64, and 20.8% who were 65 years of age or older. The median age was 40 years. For every 100 females, there were 82.0 males. For every 100 females age 18 and over, there were 77.4 males.

The median income for a household in the village was $23,925, and the median income for a family was $31,927. Males had a median income of $25,098 versus $16,119 for females. The per capita income for the village was $14,105. About 21.2% of families and 22.1% of the population were below the poverty line, including 35.1% of those under age 18 and 14.6% of those age 65 or over.

Arts and culture

The Belmont County Victorian Mansion Museum is located in Barnesville. The museum includes twenty-six rooms restored to the Victorian era.

The village is the host of the Barnesville Pumpkin Festival every September, attracting tourists from the area.

Education
The village of Barnesville is served by the Barnesville Exempted Village School District. The village's schools saw a renovation in 2002 to improve and expand classroom learning and appearances.

There are three main schools in the village:
Barnesville Elementary School,
Barnesville Middle School, and
Barnesville High School.

Also located in the village is Olney Friends School, a small co-educational boarding high school affiliated with the Religious Society of Friends (Quakers).

Notable people
 Nathan Huntley Edgerton, Barnesville native, Civil War Medal of Honor recipient
 Elisha Gray, claimant to the title of inventor of the telephone
 Isaac Charles Parker, "The Hanging Judge"
 Stanley Plumly, poet
 George Shannon, member of Lewis and Clark Expedition
 Wilson Shannon, First native born Ohio Governor

Gallery

References

External links

 
 Village website
 Barnesville Area Chamber of Commerce
 Barnesville Pumpkin Festival

 
Villages in Belmont County, Ohio
Villages in Ohio
English-American culture in Ohio
1835 establishments in Ohio
Populated places established in 1835